Forest Park High School is a four-year public high school located in Forest Park, Georgia, United States. It is part of Clayton County Public Schools. Middle schools generally associated with Forest Park High School are Forest Park Middle and Babb Middle.

Forest Park High School, one of Clayton County Public Schools oldest high schools, was established in 1928.

Notable alumni
 Philip M. Breedlove, Air Force general
 Hines Ward, former Pittsburgh Steelers wide receiver
 Bill Lee, former Georgia Representative 
 Charlton Warren, college football coach

References 

Public high schools in Georgia (U.S. state)
Schools in Clayton County, Georgia